Khenchela District is a district of Khenchela Province, Algeria.

Districts of Khenchela Province